The men's 100 metres at the 2022 World Athletics Championships was held at the Hayward Field in Eugene on 15 and 16 July 2022. 76 athletes from 53 nations entered to the competition.

Summary
The defending champion Christian Coleman  got his customary fast start, with Marvin Bracy, Abdul Hakim Sani Brown and Aaron Brown all out fast on the opposite side of the track.  By 40 metres Bracy and Coleman were clear leaders with Fred Kerley just an arm's length back.  Over the next 20 metres, Bracy separated to a full metre over Kerley as Coleman was straining.  Next to last out of the blocks, Trayvon Bromell came back to pass Coleman with 30 metres to go as all four American sprinters occupied the top places with Bromell about even with Kerley and Bracy clearly ahead.  In the three steps from 20 to 10 metres before the finish, Kerley made up the gap on Bracy and in the final 10 metres edged ahead.  Bracy began to lean early straining for the finish, almost being caught by Bromell for silver, the medal decided by 2 thousandths of a second.

In the premiere event of the games, USA achieved a sweep at home. Meanwhile, defending 2021 Olympic gold medalist, Marcell Jacobs of Italy, ran a 10.02 in his opening heat and withdrew from the semi-finals, citing a thigh injury.

Records
Before the competition records were as follows:

Qualification standard
The standard to qualify automatically for entry was 10.05.

Schedule
The event schedule, in local time (UTC−7), was as follows:

Results

Preliminary round 
The preliminary round took place on 15 July, with the 28 athletes involved being splitted into 4 heats of 7 athletes each. The first 2 athletes in each heat ( Q ) and the next 6 fastest ( q ) qualified for the round 1. The overall results were as follows:

Wind:Heat 1: +0.5 m/s, Heat 2: -0.1 m/s, Heat 3: 0.0 m/s, Heat 4: +1.1 m/s

Round 1 (heats)
The round 1 took place on 15 July, with the 57 athletes involved being splitted into 7 heats, 6 heats of 8 and 1 of 9 athletes. The first 3 athletes in each heat ( Q ) and the next 3 fastest ( q ) qualified for the semi-final. The overall results were as follows:

Wind:Heat 1: -0.1 m/s, Heat 2: +0.1 m/s, Heat 3: +0.6 m/s, Heat 4: +0.2 m/s, Heat 5: +1.1 m/s, Heat 6: +0.5 m/s, Heat 7: -0.3 m/s

Semi-final
The semi-final took place on 16 July, with the 24 athletes involved being splitted into 3 heats of 8 athletes each. The first 2 athletes in each heat ( Q ) and the next 2 fastest ( q ) qualified for the final. The overall results were as follows:

Wind:Heat 1: +0.3 m/s, Heat 2: +0.1 m/s, Heat 3: -0.1 m/s

Final 
The final was started at 19:50 on 16 July. The results were as follows:

Wind: -0.1 m/s

References

100
100 metres at the World Athletics Championships